"Love You So" is a song written by Ron Holden and performed by Holden featuring The Thunderbirds. It reached #7 on the U.S. pop chart and #11 on the U.S. R&B chart in 1960.  It was featured on his 1960 album Love You So...

The song ranked #48 on Billboard magazine's Top 100 singles of 1960.

Other versions
Demolition Doll Rods released a version of the song as the B-side to their 2000 single "Love Bug".

References

1959 songs
1959 debut singles